The year 1865 in architecture involved some significant architectural events and new buildings.

Events
 George Gilbert Scott wins the competition to design the St Pancras railway station hotel and buildings in London.

Buildings and structures

Buildings completed

 Amhuinnsuidhe Castle, Harris, Scotland, built for Charles Murray, 7th Earl of Dunmore, by David Bryce. In 2003 Amhuinnsuidhe Castle Estate purchases the castle (and its fishing rights).
 Cefn Coed Viaduct, Wales, designed by Alexander Sutherland and Henry Conybeare.
 Government House, Brisbane, Australia, designed by Benjamin Backhouse.
 Bataclan theatre in Paris, designed by Charles Duval.
 Iron-framed shipping warehouses at Saint-Ouen in Paris, designed by engineer Hippolyte Fontaine.
 Crossness Pumping Station, serving the London sewage system, designed by engineer Joseph Bazalgette and architect Charles Henry Driver.
 Stowford and Magnolia Cottages, Stowford, Cheshire, England, designed by William Eden Nesfield.

Awards
 RIBA Royal Gold Medal – James Pennethorne.
 Grand Prix de Rome, architecture: Jules Machard, André Hennebicq, Gustave Huberti.

Births
 April 27 – Archibald Leitch, Scottish architect, designer of football stadia (died 1939)
 September 20 – William Weir, Scottish-born conservation architect (died 1950)
 October 23 – Baillie Scott, British architect (died 1945)
 November 17 – , French architect (died 1953)
 date unknown
 Józef Gosławski, Polish architect (died 1904)
 Philip Mainwaring Johnston, English architect (died 1936)

Deaths
 January 8 – John Dobson, English neoclassical architect (born 1787)
 June 8 – Joseph Paxton, English gardener, architect and Member of Parliament, best known for The Crystal Palace (born 1803)
 December 4 – Francis Fowke, British engineer and architect (born 1823)
 December 23 – Alan Stevenson, Scottish lighthouse engineer (born 1807)

References

Architecture
Years in architecture
19th-century architecture